The 1968 Democratic National Convention was held August 26–29 at the International Amphitheatre in Chicago, Illinois, United States. Earlier that year incumbent President Lyndon B. Johnson had announced he would not seek reelection, thus making the purpose of the convention to select a new presidential nominee for the Democratic Party. The keynote speaker was Senator Daniel Inouye of Hawaii. Vice President Hubert Humphrey and Senator Edmund Muskie of Maine were nominated for president and vice president, respectively. The most contentious issues of the convention were the continuing American military involvement in the Vietnam War and voting reform, particularly expanding the right to vote for draft-age soldiers (age 18) who were unable to vote as the voting age was 21. The convention also marked a turning point where previously idle groups such as youth and minorities became more involved in politics and voting.

The convention of 1968 was held during a year of riots, political turbulence, and mass civil unrest. The assassination of Martin Luther King Jr. in April of that year inflamed racial tensions to an unprecedented level. King assassination riots in more than 100 cities followed and marked the end of the civil rights movement. The convention also followed the assassination of Robert F. Kennedy on June 5. Kennedy's assassination derailed the convention, paving the way for Humphrey. Both Kennedy and Senator Eugene McCarthy of Minnesota had been running for the Democratic nomination at the time. The Humphrey–Muskie ticket would be defeated in the presidential election by the Republican ticket of Richard Nixon and Spiro Agnew.

Before the convention

The Democratic Party, which controlled the House of Representatives, the Senate, and the White House in 1968, was divided. Senator Eugene McCarthy entered the campaign in November 1967, challenging incumbent President Lyndon Johnson for the Democratic nomination. Senator Robert F. Kennedy entered the race in March 1968.

Johnson, facing dissent within his party, and having only barely won the New Hampshire primary, announced that he would not seek re-election on March 31, 1968. The Wisconsin primary was scheduled for April 2, and public opinion polls showed Johnson as third in the race, behind McCarthy and Kennedy. For an incumbent president to come in third in a primary would be unprecedented humiliation, and for Johnson it was better to drop out of the race on March 31 rather than to come in third in the Wisconsin primary. In his television address announcing his withdrawal from the presidential race, Johnson also announced the United States would stop bombing North Vietnam north of the 19th parallel and was willing to open peace talks. On April 27 Vice President Hubert Humphrey entered into the race but did not compete in any primaries; instead he inherited the delegates previously pledged to Johnson and then collected delegates in caucus states, especially in caucuses controlled by local Democratic bosses.

Peace talks had begun in Paris on May 13, 1968, but almost immediately became deadlocked as Xuan Thuy, the head of the North Vietnamese delegation, demanded that the U.S. give a promise to unconditionally stop bombing North Vietnam, a demand rejected by W. Averell Harriman of the American delegation. Like many other newly independent nations in Africa and Asia, the North Vietnamese were extremely sensitive about threats to their newly won sovereignty and independence. Under French colonial rule, the French had carried out their policy of mission civilisatrice, under which the Vietnamese were to be "civilized" by being assimilated into the French language and culture, which had caused an intense Vietnamese nationalist reaction. Ho Chi Minh and all of the other Vietnamese communist leaders had spent decades struggling against the French, and he, together with the rest of the Politburo, felt that the U.S. dropping bombs on North Vietnam was a violation of their country's sovereignty. In a way that many Americans had trouble understanding, Ho felt that to negotiate with the Americans reserving the right to bomb North Vietnam whenever they wanted to would diminish the country's independence. Right from the moment Operation Rolling Thunder started in 1965, the North Vietnamese had demanded the U.S. unconditionally halt the bombing as the first step towards peace. Though the North Vietnamese had agreed to talk in 1968, it soon became apparent that no progress would be possible in Paris until the U.S. promised to unconditionally cease bombing, as the talks floundered on that issue all through the spring, summer and fall of 1968.

After Kennedy's assassination on June 5, the Democratic Party's divisions grew. At the moment of Kennedy's death the delegate count stood at Humphrey 561.5, Kennedy 393.5, McCarthy 258. Kennedy's murder left his delegates uncommitted. Support within the Democratic Party was divided between McCarthy, who ran a decidedly anti-war campaign and was seen as the peace candidate; Humphrey, who was seen as the candidate representing the Johnson point of view; and Senator George McGovern, who appealed to some of the Kennedy supporters.

Convention
Before the start of the convention on August 26, several states had competing slates of delegates attempting to be seated at the convention. Some of these delegate credential fights went to the floor of the convention on August 26, where votes were held to determine which slates of delegates representing Texas, Georgia, Alabama, Mississippi and North Carolina would be seated at the convention. The more racially integrated challenging slate from Texas was defeated.

The convention was among the most tense and confrontational political conventions ever in American history. The convention's host, Mayor Richard J. Daley of Chicago, had refused permission for "anti-patriotic" groups to demonstrate at the convention, and had the International Amphitheatre, where the convention was being held, ringed with barbed wire while putting the 11,000 officers of the Chicago Police Department on twelve-hour shifts. In addition, there were 6,000 armed men from the Illinois National Guard called up to guard the International Amphitheatre, giving the feeling that Chicago was a city under siege. Todd Gitlin, one of the leaders of the Students for a Democratic Society (SDS) protest group, was highly worried about the potential for violence, and at a speech paraphrased a lyric from a song, "San Francisco (Be Sure to Wear Flowers in Your Hair)", saying: "If you're going to Chicago, be sure to wear some armor in your hair".

Johnson had wanted the Democratic convention to be held in Houston, but Daley had successfully lobbied the president to have the convention held in Chicago, as he wanted the convention held in his city to showcase to the national media how successful he had been since he started serving as mayor in 1955. Daley, a man who ruled Chicago in an extremely authoritarian style, felt very strongly that the protesters were going to ruin what was supposed to be his moment of triumph and was determined to stop them. One of Daley's aides told the media that the anti-war demonstrators were "revolutionaries bent on the destruction of America". The mayor attempted to impose restrictions to keep protesters as far away as possible from the convention, on their numbers, and on their activities, making it very clear that he much preferred that no protesters come to his city. Two of the SDS leaders, Tom Hayden and Rennie Davis, had planned to keep their protests peaceful, but the lack of permits for protesting together with thinly veiled threats that the Chicago police would beat demonstrators made it clear that there would probably be violence. When the media reported that Daley had given orders to the police to restrict the activities of Democratic delegates loyal to McCarthy, Daley was enraged, giving a rambling press conference saying, "This is a vicious attack on this city and its mayor".

The leaders of the Yippies (an acronym for Youth International Party), Abbie Hoffman and Jerry Rubin, specialized in outlandish, bizarre rhetoric that attracted maximum media attention, and Daley took many of their more outrageous threats seriously. To sabotage the convention, Hoffman and Rubin announced that they were sending "super-hot" hippie girls to seduce the delegates and give them LSD; that they were going to put LSD into the water supply of the International Amphitheatre; and were sending well-endowed hippie "studs" to seduce the wives and daughters of the delegates. In a typical press release, Hoffman and Rubin stated about their plans in Chicago: "We are dirty, smelly, grimy and foul...we will piss and shit and fuck in public...we will be constantly stoned or tripping on every drug known to man". Daley took all of this seriously, and much of the excessive security was due to his belief that the Yippies were going to disrupt the convention in the manner that they had proclaimed they would.
 
Daley's heavy-handed security measures incensed the media. Walter Cronkite complained of "a totally unwarranted restriction of free and rapid access to information." Eric Sevareid stated that Chicago "runs the city of Prague a close second right now as the world's least attractive tourist destination". Intelligence agents had infiltrated the protesters, including agents from the Central Intelligence Agency, who  contrary to American law  had been sent to spy upon Americans in the United States. Just before the convention started, Hoffman and Rubin showed up at the Civic Center Plaza to free the pig named Pigasus whom they had nominated as the Democratic candidate, leading the police to seize Pigasus while arresting Rubin and five others. The Pigasus incident was captured live on television. Over 10,000 people had arrived in Chicago to protest against the Vietnam War, and the city in late August was much on the edge. The Chicago police raided the mostly black neighborhoods of South Chicago to stage mass arrests of the Blackstone Rangers, a black power group that was alleged to be planning to assassinate Humphrey. When Humphrey arrived in Chicago, Daley was not at the airport to greet him, instead sending a police bagpipe band to welcome him. As Humphrey was driven to his room at the Conrad Hilton hotel, he noticed that no one in the streets cheered him, in marked contrast to the arrival of McCarthy who was greeted by 5,000 cheering supporters when he landed in Chicago.

Within the convention itself, tensions were much evident between pro-war and anti-war Democrats. One of the principal issues at the peace talks in Paris was the North Vietnamese demand that the U.S. unconditionally cease bombing North Vietnam as an essential precondition before discussing other matters. The more dovish Democrats favored accepting the North Vietnamese demand while more hawkish Democrats demanded the North Vietnamese promise not to send any men down the Ho Chi Minh Trail as their precondition for a bombing pause, a demand that the North Vietnamese rejected. Humphrey, confronted with a divided party, attempted to craft a party platform that would appeal to both factions, writing a platform calling for a bombing pause that "took into account, most importantly, the risk to American troops as well as the response from Hanoi." Humphrey's platform held out the possibility of a complete bombing pause without explicitly saying so, though Humphrey's statements suggested that if elected president he would order a complete bombing pause. Anticipating the "Vietnamization" strategy later carried out by Richard Nixon, Humphrey's platform called for the "de-Americanization" of the war as it called for the U.S. to gradually pull out American troops from South Vietnam and to shift the burden of fighting the war back to the South Vietnamese.

Humphrey previewed his platform to two of Johnson's more hawkish advisers, Secretary of State Dean Rusk and National Security Advisor Walt Whitman Rostow. Rostow very reluctantly gave his approval while Rusk told Humphrey, "We can live with this, Hubert." Johnson, despite not attending the convention as he had chosen to decamp to his ranch in Texas instead, maintained a very tight control over the proceedings and angrily rejected Humphrey's compromise peace plank as a personal affront, telling Humphrey in a telephone call to change his plank at once. When Humphrey protested that, "Dean Rusk approved it," Johnson shouted over the phone: "That's not the way I hear it. Well, this just undercuts our whole policy, and by God, the Democratic Party ought not to be doing that to me, and you ought not to be doing it. You've been a part of the policy." To put further pressure on Humphrey, Johnson called up General Creighton Abrams, the commander of the U.S. forces in Vietnam, to ask if a complete bombing pause would endanger the lives of American soldiers; Abrams, unaware that Johnson's question was really about an intra-Democratic dispute, replied that it would. Johnson, who also received Abrams's answer to his question in writing, passed on a copy to Hale Boggs, the chairman of the Democratic National Committee (DNC), who in turn showed it to various leading delegates to show how reckless and "unpatriotic" Humphrey was in contemplating a bombing pause. Faced with Johnson's fury, Humphrey gave in and accepted a plank that was more to Johnson's liking. Johnson always had a strong contempt for Humphrey, a man whom he liked to bully, telling Secretary of Defense Clark Clifford that he would respect Humphrey more if only he "showed he had some balls." Through some of Humphrey's advisors counseled him to defy the lame-duck president, Humphrey resignedly stated: "Well, it would not look like an act based on principle or conviction; it would seem like a gimmick. It would seem strange. And it would enrage the president."

The platform that Humphrey had written on Johnson's dictation was introduced onto the floor of the convention and prompted a passionate three-hour long debate on the floor, as anti-war Democrats were unrelenting in their objections. The platform was passed by a narrow margin, with 1,567 delegates voting for the platform while 1,041 voted against. When the platform was passed, the delegation from New York put on black armbands and began to sing "We Shall Overcome" in protest. Humphrey later stated that his biggest mistake of the 1968 election was to have given in to Johnson, contending that if he stuck to his original platform it would have differentiated himself enough from Johnson to give him a lead in the polls. Humphrey always believed that if he gave the speech that he planned to give in Chicago and later gave in Salt Lake City on September 30, 1968, calling for an unconditional bombing pause of North Vietnam as "an acceptable risk for peace," that he would have won the election.

Humphrey also complained that the convention had been held in late August to coincide with Johnson's birthday, which cost him a month to organize, and would preferred to have the convention held in July. Complicating the election was the third party candidacy of Alabama governor George Wallace, who ran on a white supremacist platform promising to undo all of the changes wrought by the Civil Rights Movement. Traditionally, conservative whites in the South had voted as a bloc for the Democrats, but in the 1960s many were starting to move away from the Democratic Party. Nixon had embarked upon his Southern strategy of wooing conservative Southern whites over to the Republicans, but Wallace (who had the advantage of always appearing more extreme on racial questions than was possible for Nixon) threatened to upend the Southern strategy. Johnson had wanted Humphrey to nominate as his running mate a conservative white Southern Democrat who might prevent Southern whites from voting for Wallace or Nixon, bringing back to the Democratic Party a group who had been one of the most loyal Democratic voting blocs for over a century. Humphrey managed to muster up the courage to defy Johnson and choose as his running mate Senator Edmund Muskie of Maine, a dignified, centrist Democrat.

Humphrey had been well known as a liberal supporter of the Civil Rights Movement, and he felt that with Nixon and Wallace competing for the conservative white Southern voters there was no realistic opportunity for him to appeal to that group. In 1948, Humphrey, at that time the mayor of Minneapolis, had first come to national attention when he delivered a speech at the 1948 Democratic National Convention denouncing racial injustices in the South. However, over the protests of liberals, Humphrey did not resist Johnson's decision to seat several all-white delegations from several Southern states despite the complaints that Black Americans (and in the case of the Texas delegation, Mexican-Americans) had been consciously excluded.

Johnson distrusted Humphrey and had the Federal Bureau of Investigation illegally tap his telephones to find out what the vice president was planning to do. At the same time, though Johnson had announced that he had dropped out of the election, he sent his friend John Connally, the Governor of Texas, to meet with other Democratic governors of southern states attending the convention to inquire if they would be willing to support nominating Johnson to be the Democratic candidate after all. Daley, a strong Johnson supporter, was enthusiastic about having Johnson re-enter the election. Daley, who was apparently oblivious of the depth of the antagonism between Johnson and the Kennedy family, favored having Senator Ted Kennedy serve as Johnson's running mate, saying that a "LBJ-TEK" ticket would easily win the election. Daley was so committed to having Johnson re-enter the race that he had secretly printed up signs reading "We Love LBJ" to be waved about by the delegates when he was to announce that Johnson return to the race. He also called up Kennedy to discuss his plans, but Kennedy, who was seriously depressed after the assassination of his brother Robert, was not interested in attending the convention nor in being a candidate. It remains unclear if Johnson was actually serious about re-entering the presidential race, or if he was merely using the prospect of running again as a way to keep Humphrey from straying too far from his policies. Regardless of what Johnson was intending, Connally had to tell his fellow Texan that general feeling about Johnson being the Democratic candidate in 1968 was, "No way!"

The security measures imposed by Daley had been so intense that it was not possible to walk across the convention floor without jostling other delegates, which added to the tensions as dovish and hawkish Democrats fiercely argued about whether to accept Johnson's war plank to the platform. All of it was captured live on national television. Pro-war Democrats challenged the right of the economist John Kenneth Galbraith, who was serving as the floor manager for McCarthy, to be there and sought to have him expelled from the convention. Inside the convention hall were televisions showing the police beating and clubbing demonstrators outside, which increased the tension. Robert Maytag, the chairman of the Colorado delegation asked: "Is there any rule under which Mayor Daley can be compelled to suspend the police state terror being perpetrated at this minute on kids in front of the Conrad Hilton [hotel]?" Daley's face flushed with anger while his supporters began to boo Maytag. On the convention floor, Senator Abraham Ribicoff rose to give a speech nominating McGovern as the Democratic candidate. During his speech, Ribicoff pointed to Daley and said: "With George McGovern, we wouldn't have Gestapo tactics on the streets of Chicago." Pandemonium broke out in the convention hall, with some delegates praising Ribicoff while others denounced him. Daley rose up to scream at the top of his voice at Ribicoff: "Fuck you, you Jew son of bitch! You lousy motherfucker! Go home!" Despite Daley's foul-mouthed antisemitic tirade, Ribicoff merely said: "How hard it is to accept the truth. How hard it is." Four Chicago city officials, known Daley loyalists, jumped on the stage to usher Ribicoff away, and Daley's bodyguards surrounded him, though from what threat they protected him remained unclear.

The convention was noteworthy for leading to a significant change in the rules governing delegate selection, largely overshadowed at the time by the rioting in Chicago. The McGovern–Fraser Commission, chaired by Senator McGovern, officially known as the Commission on Party Structure and Delegate Selection, was appointed to examine how delegates were selected. The commission documented that in many places in America the Democratic Party was "an autocratic, authoritarian organization" that engaged in the "shameful exploitation of the voter."

Nomination
In the end, the Democratic Party nominated Humphrey. The delegates had defeated the peace plank by 1,567¾ to 1,041¼. The loss was perceived to be the result of Johnson and Daley influencing behind the scenes. Humphrey, who had not entered any of the thirteen state primary elections, won the Democratic nomination shortly after midnight, and many delegates shouted, "No! No!" when his victory was announced. The nomination was watched by 89 million Americans. As a sign of racial reconciliation, Humphrey had intended for his nomination to be seconded by a speech by Carl Stokes, the Black mayor of Cleveland, Ohio. Stokes's speech was not shown on live national television as planned, as the networks instead broadcast live the "Battle of Michigan Avenue" that was taking place in front of the Conrad Hilton hotel. Humphrey went on to lose the 1968 presidential election to the Republican Richard Nixon.

Gallery of candidates

First ballot

Dan Rather incident
On the second night of the convention, CBS News correspondent Dan Rather was grabbed by security guards and roughed up while trying to interview a Georgia delegate being escorted out of the building. CBS News anchorman Walter Cronkite turned his attention towards the area where Rather was reporting from the convention floor. Rather was grabbed by security guards after he walked toward the delegate who was being hauled out, and asked him, "What is your name, sir?" Rather was wearing a microphone headset and was then heard on national television repeatedly saying to the guards "don't push me" and "take your hands off me unless you plan to arrest me".

After the guards let go of Rather, he told Cronkite:"Walter ... we tried to talk to the man and we got violently pushed out of the way. This is the kind of thing that has been going on outside the hall, this is the first time we've had it happen inside the hall. We ... I'm sorry to be out of breath, but somebody belted me in the stomach during that. What happened is a Georgia delegate, at least he had a Georgia delegate sign on, was being hauled out of the hall. We tried to talk to him to see why, who he was, what the situation was, and at that instant the security people, well as you can see, put me on the deck. I didn't do very well." An angry Cronkite tersely replied, "I think we've got a bunch of thugs here, Dan."

Richard J. Daley and the convention

Daley intended to showcase his and the city's achievements to national Democrats and the news media. Instead, the proceedings became notorious for the large number of demonstrators and the use of force by the Chicago police during what was supposed to be, in the words of Yippie activist organizers, "A Festival of Life." Rioting took place by the Chicago Police Department and the Illinois National Guard against the demonstrators. The disturbances were well publicized by the mass media, with some journalists and reporters being caught up in the violence. Network newsmen Dan Rather, Mike Wallace, and Edwin Newman were assaulted by the Chicago police while inside the convention hall.

The Democratic National Convention had been held in Chicago twelve years earlier. Daley had played an integral role in the election of John F. Kennedy in 1960. In 1968, however, it did not seem that Daley had maintained the clout which would allow him to bring out the voters again to produce a Democratic victory as he had in 1960.

On October 7, 1967, Daley and Johnson had a private meeting at a fund raiser for Johnson's re-election campaign, with an entry fee of one thousand dollars per plate (approximately $7,200 in 2016 dollars). During the meeting, Daley explained to the president that there had been a disappointing showing of Democrats in the 1966 congressional races, and the president might lose the swing state of Illinois with its 26 electoral votes if the convention were not held there. Johnson's pro-war policies had already created a great division within the party; he hoped that the selection of Chicago for the convention would eliminate further conflict with opposition. The DNC head for selecting the location was David Wilentz of New Jersey, who gave the official reason for choosing Chicago as, "It is centrally located geographically which will reduce transportation costs and because it has been the site of national conventions for both Parties in the past and is therefore attuned to holding them." The conversation between Johnson and Daley was leaked to the press and published in the Chicago Tribune and several other papers.

In preparation for the convention, Daley had walls erected along the roads to the Amphitheatre through his own neighborhood of Bridgeport to obscure from sight rundown housing in the neighborhood.

Protests and police response

In 1968, the Yippies and the National Mobilization Committee to End the War in Vietnam (MOBE) had already begun planning a youth festival in Chicago to coincide with the convention. They were not alone, as other groups such as the SDS would also make their presence known. When asked about anti-war demonstrators, Daley repeated to reporters that "no thousands will come to our city and take over our streets, our city, our convention." 10,000 demonstrators gathered in Chicago for the convention, where they were met by 23,000 police and National Guardsmen. Daley also thought that one way to prevent demonstrators from coming to Chicago was to refuse to grant permits which would allow for people to protest legally.

After the violence at the convention, Daley said his primary reason for calling in so many Guardsmen and police was reports he received indicating the existence of plots to assassinate many Democratic Party leaders, including himself.

While several protests had taken place before serious violence occurred, the events headed by the Yippies were not without satire. Surrounded by reporters on August 23, 1968, Yippie leader Rubin, folk singer Phil Ochs, and other activists held their own presidential nominating convention with their candidate Pigasus, an actual pig. When the Yippies paraded Pigasus at the Civic Center, ten policemen arrested Ochs, Rubin, Pigasus, and six others. This resulted in a great deal of media attention for Pigasus.

A peaceful demonstration was held in Lincoln Park led by Rubin and Hoffman, with the Yippie leaders calling the demonstrators to respect the 11pm curfew. The Beatnik poet Allen Ginsberg ended the demonstration by chanting "Om". The next day was supposed to be the "Festival of Life" in Lincoln Park, but the police confiscated the truck upon which a rock band was to play. The mood soon turned ugly with the demonstrators calling the police, "Motherfuckers!" while the police shouted, "Kill the Commies!" The police fired tear gas into the crowd while beating up the photographers and journalists present. Tom Hayden, one of the leaders of the SDS and co-organizer of the protests, was arrested for the first time.

The next day, what was billed as "Unbirthday Party" for President Johnson was planned to be held in Lincoln Park. Hayden, who had been freed on bail after his arrest the previous day, attended the "Unbirthday Party". He was recognized by a policeman, Constable Ralph Bell, who beat him and then arrested him for violating his bail conditions. Also attending the "Unbirthday Party" were Rubin and Bobby Seale of the Black Panther Party, who both called for "roasting pigs" in their speeches. In the evening, a demonstration was held at Grant Park opposite the Hilton Hotel, which was peaceful as bands such as Peter, Paul and Mary played folk music. When 600 Illinois National Guardsmen appeared, Hayden, who had been bailed out a second time, picked up his megaphone to shout that everybody should go home.

Chicago Police riot

On August 28, 1968, around 10,000 protesters gathered in Grant Park for the demonstration, intending to march to the International Amphitheatre where the convention was being held. At approximately 3:30 p.m., a young man lowered the American flag that was at the park. The police broke through the crowd and began beating the young man, while the crowd pelted the police with food, rocks, and chunks of concrete. The chants of some of the protesters shifted from, "Hell no, we won't go!" to, "Pigs are whores!"

Hayden encouraged protesters to move out of the park to ensure that if the police used tear gas on them, it would have to be done throughout the city. The police soon gained the upper hand after firing tear gas and chased the demonstrators down the streets, beating them with clubs and rifle butts before arresting them. The amount of tear gas used to suppress the protesters was so great that it made its way to the Conrad Hilton, where it disturbed Humphrey while in his shower. The police sprayed demonstrators and bystanders with mace and were taunted by some protesters with chants of, "Kill, kill, kill!" The police responded by shouting, "Get out of here, you cocksuckers!". Police indiscriminately attacked all who were present, regardless if they involved in the demonstrations or not. Dick Gregory, the comedian who attended the protests, told the crowd that the police were merely following the orders of Daley and "the crooks downtown".

The MOBE leaders then decided to march down Michigan Avenue to the Conrad Hilton hotel, where many of the Democratic delegates were staying. The Illinois National Guard guarding the hotel fired tear gas while the police moved in to beat the demonstrators. The police assault in front of the hotel during the evening of August 28 became the most famous image of the Chicago demonstrations of 1968. The entire event took place live under television lights for seventeen minutes with the crowd chanting, "The whole world is watching". Samuel Brown, one of the organizers for Senator McCarthy, lamented the violence, saying: "Instead of nice young people ringing doorbells, the public saw the image of mobs shouting obscenities and disrupting the city". Brown stated the demonstrations at Chicago had been a disaster for the anti-war movement, as the American people saw the protesters as the trouble-makers and the heavy-handed police response as justified. The general feeling at the time was the hippies were intent upon destroying everything good in America and the Chicago police had acted correctly in beating such dangerous anti-social types bloody. In a telephone call to President Johnson on Saturday, September 7, 1968, Daley described some of the activity undertaken by the elements of the protesters, which he described as "Professional Trouble Makers", these activities included the burning of the American Flag, raising of the Viet Cong flag and throwing both manure and urine at the police.

In its report Rights in Conflict (better known as the Walker Report), the Chicago Study Team that investigated the violent clashes between police and protesters at the convention stated that the police response was characterized by: unrestrained and indiscriminate police violence on many occasions, particularly at night. That violence was made all the more shocking by the fact that it was often inflicted upon persons who had broken no law, disobeyed no order, made no threat. These included peaceful demonstrators, onlookers, and large numbers of residents who were simply passing through, or happened to live in, the areas where confrontations were occurring.

The Walker Report, "headed by an independent observer from Los Angeles police – concluded that: 'Individual policemen, and lots of them, committed violent acts far in excess of the requisite force for crowd dispersal or arrest. To read dispassionately the hundreds of statements describing at firsthand the events of Sunday and Monday nights is to become convinced of the presence of what can only be called a police riot.'"

Senator Ribicoff used his nominating speech for McGovern to report the violence going on outside the convention hall and said that, "With George McGovern as President of the United States, we wouldn't have to have Gestapo tactics in the streets of Chicago!" Daley responded to his remark with something unintelligible through the television sound, although lip-readers throughout America claimed to have observed him shouting, "Fuck you, you Jew son of a bitch!" Defenders of the mayor would later claim that he was calling Ribicoff a faker, a charge denied by Daley and refuted by Mike Royko's reporting. Ribicoff replied: "How hard it is to accept the truth!" That night, NBC News had been switching back and forth between images of the violence to the festivities over Humphrey's victory in the convention hall, highlighting the division in the Democratic Party.

According to The Guardian, "[a]fter four days and nights of violence, 668 people had been arrested, 425 demonstrators were treated at temporary medical facilities, 200 were treated on the spot, 400 given first aid for tear gas exposure and 110 went to hospital. A total of 192 police officers were injured."

After the Chicago protests, some demonstrators believed the majority of Americans would side with them over what had happened in Chicago, especially because of police behavior. The controversy over the war in Vietnam overshadowed their cause. Daley shared he had received 135,000 letters supporting his actions and only 5,000 condemning them. Public opinion polls demonstrated that the majority of Americans supported the mayor's tactics. It was often commented through the popular media that on that evening, America decided to vote for Richard Nixon.

After the convention, which had very publicly exposed the fault-lines between hawkish and dovish Democrats, Humphrey was 22 points behind Nixon in the polls. By contrast to the violence and chaos in Chicago, the Republican convention in Miami had been a model of order and unity, which made Nixon appear better qualified to be president as even Humphrey himself conceded in private.

On September 30, 1968, Humphrey gave a speech in Salt Lake City that he had intended to deliver at the convention in Chicago, saying he was willing to unconditionally stop the bombing of North Vietnam to break the deadlock in the peace talks in Paris. At this point, Humphrey, who was behind in the polls, saw his numbers began to rise; Nixon was certainly concerned in October 1968 that he might lose the election. By late October 1968, Humphrey had a slight lead with 44% intending to vote for him compared to 43% for Nixon. The election of 1968 was one of the closest ever in American history with Nixon winning 31.7 million votes, Humphrey 31.2 million votes and Wallace 10 million votes.

Chicago Seven

A grand jury charged eight defendants with conspiracy, crossing state lines with intent to incite a riot, and other federal crimes following the 1968 Democratic National Convention. The defendants became known as the Chicago Eight: Abbie Hoffman, Jerry Rubin, Tom Hayden, Bobby Seale, Rennie Davis, David Dellinger, John Froines, and Lee Weiner. During the trial, the case against Bobby Seale was declared a mistrial, and the Chicago Eight then became the Chicago Seven. Demonstrations were held daily during the trial, organized by the MOBE, the Young Lords led by Jose Cha Cha Jimenez, and the local Black Panther Party led by Chairman Fred Hampton. In February 1970, five of the seven defendants were convicted of crossing state lines with intent to incite a riot, and all were acquitted of conspiracy. Froines and Weiner were acquitted on all charges.

While the jury was deliberating, Judge Julius Hoffman sentenced the defendants and their attorneys to jail terms ranging from  months to 4 years for contempt of court. In 1972, the convictions were reversed on appeal, and the government declined to bring the case to trial again.

The McGovern–Fraser Commission

In response to the party disunity and electoral failure that came out of the convention, the party established the 'Commission on Party Structure and Delegate Selection' (informally known as the 'McGovern–Fraser Commission'), to examine current rules on the ways candidates were nominated and make recommendations designed to broaden participation and enable better representation for minorities and others who were underrepresented. The commission established more open procedures and affirmative action guidelines for selecting delegates. The changes imposed by the commission required that the number of delegates who were Black, women, Hispanic and between the ages of 18-30 reflected the proportion of the people in those groups in every congressional district.

In addition the commission required all delegate selection procedures to be open; party leaders could no longer handpick the delegates in secret. The changes brought about by the commission ended the ability of local bosses who headed political machines such as Daley to ensure delegations that were subservient to them attended conventions. The rule changes brought by the commission also marked the beginning of end of the Democratic delegations that were almost entirely male and usually entirely white, ensuring in the future Democratic delegations would be more diverse. An unforeseen result of these rules was a large shift toward state presidential primaries. Prior to the reforms, Democrats in two-thirds of the states used state conventions to choose convention delegates. In the post-reform era, over three-quarters of the states use primary elections to choose delegates, and over 80% of convention delegates are selected in these primaries.

See also
1968 Republican National Convention
Protests of 1968
1968 United States presidential election
History of the United States Democratic Party
List of Democratic National Conventions
United States presidential nominating convention
1968 Democratic Party presidential primaries
Hubert Humphrey 1968 presidential campaign
Superdelegate, a Democratic Party delegate classification which originated following the 1968 national convention

References

Further reading
 Adam Cohen and Elizabeth Taylor American Pharaoh: Mayor Richard J. Daley - His Battle for Chicago and the Nation, New York: Back Bay Books, 2001. 
 David Farber. Chicago '68. Chicago: University of Chicago Press, 1988.
 Todd Gitlin. The Sixties: Years of Hope, Days of Rage. Toronto: Bantam Books, 1987.
 Peter Jennings and Todd Brewster. The Century. New York: Doubleday, 1998
 Stanley Karnow Vietnam A History, New York, Viking, 1983. 
 Frank Kusch. Battleground Chicago: The Police and the 1968 Democratic National Convention. Chicago: University of Chicago Press, 2008.
 A.J. Langguth Our Vietnam: The War 1954-1975. New York: Simon and Schuster, 2000.
 Norman Mailer. Miami and the Siege of Chicago. New York: New American Library, 1968.
 Denis McNally A Long Strange Trip: The Inside History of the Grateful Dead, New York, Crown Publishing, 2007.
 Richard Parker,  John Kenneth Galbraith: His Life, His Politics, His Economics. New York: Farrar, Straus, and Giroux, 2005. 
 Rick Perlstein. Nixonland: The Rise of a President and the Fracturing of America. New York: Scribner, 1968.
 Mike Royko Boss: Richard J. Daley of Chicago New York: Plume, 1988.
 John Schultz. No One Was Killed: The Democratic National Convention, August 1968. Chicago: University of Chicago Press, 2009.
 Carl Solberg Hubert Humphrey: A Biography Minneapolis: Minnesota Historical Society Press, 2003.

External links
 Democratic Party Platform of 1968 at The American Presidency Project
 Humphrey Nomination Acceptance Speech for President at DNC (transcript) at The American Presidency Project
"1968 Democratic Convention" from C-SPAN.org. National Cable Satellite Corporation, 2014.

"Dementia in the Second City" from Time, September 6, 1968.
"The Chicago Convention: A Baptism Called A Burial" by Jo Freeman (1968)
"Chicago '68" by Alvin Susumu Tokunow (1968)
"1968 Democratic National Convention" at Smithsonian Magazine
"Chicago '68: A Chronology"
"Young Lords in Lincoln Park"
"Chicago '68: An Introduction" by Dean Blobaum (2000)
"American Experience: Chicago 1968"
"Retrospective on the 1968 Democratic Convention"  from NewsHour.
"History Files: Parades, Protests and Politics"
"Grooving in Chi"  by Terry Southern from Esquire (1968)
"Brief History of Chicago's 1968 Democratic Convention" from Allhistory, CNN and Time.
"Whole World Watching" by John Callaway
An excerpt from Chicago '68 by David Farber
An excerpt from No One Was Killed: The Democratic National Convention, August 1968 by John Schultz
An excerpt from Battleground Chicago: The Police and the 1968 Democratic National Convention by Frank Kusch
Interview on the Chicago Convention, with Phil Ochs
Origins of the Young Lords 
 Video of Humphrey nomination acceptance speech for President at DNC (via YouTube)
 Audio of Humphrey nomination acceptance speech for President at DNC
 Video of Muskie nomination acceptance speech for Vice President at DNC (via YouTube)
 Audio of Muskie nomination acceptance speech for Vice President at DNC

 
Democratic National Convention
Democratic National Convention
Democratic National Convention, 1968
20th century in Chicago
Political conventions in Chicago
Democratic Party of Illinois
Political events in Illinois
Democratic National Conventions
Democratic National Convention
Democratic National Convention
Articles containing video clips